Griselda Blanco Restrepo (February 15, 1943 – September 3, 2012), known as the Black Widow, was a Colombian drug lord of the Medellín Cartel, and in the Miami-based cocaine drug trade and underworld, during the 1970s through the early 2000s. She was shot dead on September 3, 2012, at the age of 69.

Biography

Early life
Griselda Blanco Restrepo was born in Cartagena on the country's north coast. She and her mother, Ana Blanco, moved to Medellín when she was three years old. Upon arriving there, she adopted a criminal lifestyle. Blanco's former lover, Charles Cosby, recounted that at the age of 11 she allegedly kidnapped, attempted to ransom and eventually shot a child from an upscale flatland neighborhood near her own neighborhood. Blanco had become a pickpocket before she even turned 13. To escape the sexual assaults of her mother's boyfriend, she ran away from home at the age of 19 and resorted to looting in Medellín until the age of 20.

Drug business

Blanco was a figure in the drug trade from Colombia to Miami, New York and California.

In the mid-1970s, she illegally immigrated to the United States with false passports and settled in Queens, New York. She established a sizable cocaine business there and in April 1975, she was indicted on federal drug conspiracy charges along with 30 of her subordinates. She fled to Colombia before she could be arrested, but returned to the United States and settled in Miami in the late 1980s.

Her return more or less coincided with the beginning of very public violent conflicts that involved hundreds of murders and killings yearly which were associated with the high crime epidemic that swept the City of Miami in the 1980s. The struggle by law enforcement to put an end to the influx of cocaine into Miami led to the creation of CENTAC 26 (Central Tactical Unit), a joint operation between the Miami-Dade Police Department and the Drug Enforcement Administration (DEA) anti-drug operation.

Blanco was involved in the drug-related violence known as the Miami Drug War or the Cocaine Cowboy Wars that plagued Miami in the late 1970s and early 1980s. This was a time when cocaine was trafficked more than cannabis.

The distribution network, which spanned the United States, earned $80 million per month.

Arrest
On February 17, 1985 Blanco was arrested in her home by the Drug Enforcement Administration (DEA) and charged with conspiring to manufacture, import, and distribute cocaine. The case went to trial in federal court in New York City where she was found guilty and sentenced to 15 years.

While serving her sentence, she was charged with three counts of first degree murder by the state of Florida. The prosecution made a deal with one of Blanco's most trusted hitmen, Jorge Ayala, who agreed to testify against her. However, the case collapsed due to technicalities relating to a phone sex scandal between Ayala and two female secretaries who worked in the state attorney’s office. In 1998, Blanco pleaded guilty to three counts of second degree murder and was sentenced to 20 years in prison, to run concurrently. In 2002, Blanco suffered a heart attack in prison.

In 2004, she was released and deported to Medellín. Before her murder in 2012, she was last seen in May 2007 at Bogotá Airport.

Death
On the night of 3 September 2012, Blanco bought $150 worth of meat at Cardiso butcher shop on the corner of 29th Street in Medellín. She died at age of 69 when she was shot in the head and shoulder by a motorcyclist who entered the shop.

Personal life
Blanco's first husband was Carlos Trujillo with whom she had three sons, Dixon, Uber, and Osvaldo, all of them poorly educated.

Blanco had her youngest son, Michael Corleone Blanco, with her third husband, Darío Sepúlveda. Her husband left her in 1983, returned to Colombia, and kidnapped Michael when he and Blanco disagreed over who would have custody. Blanco paid to have Sepúlveda assassinated in Colombia, and her son returned to her in Miami.

According to the Miami New Times, "Michael's father and older siblings were all killed before he reached adulthood. His mother was in prison for most of his childhood and teenage years, and he was raised by his maternal grandmother and legal guardians." In 2012, Michael was put under house arrest after an arrest in May on two felony counts of cocaine trafficking and conspiracy to traffic in cocaine. He appeared on a 2018 episode of the Investigation Discovery documentary series, Evil Lives Here, to recount his lonely childhood. In 2019, he was featured in the VH1 docuseries Cartel Crew, which follows the descendants of drug lords. He also runs a clothing brand, "Puro Blanco".

According to Michael, his mother became a born-again Christian.

Popular culture 
Blanco has been featured in multiple documentaries, series, films, and songs, including several forthcoming projects.

 She features prominently in the documentary films Cocaine Cowboys (2006) and Cocaine Cowboys 2 (2008; also written as Cocaine Cowboys II: Hustlin' With the Godmother).
 In 2010, Florida rapper Jacki-O released a mixtape "La Madrina - Griselda Blanco".
 She is portrayed by the Colombian actress Luces Velásquez in 2012 television series Pablo Escobar, The Drug Lord as the character of Graciela Rojas.
 In 2012, American rapper Westside Gunn formed a record label called Griselda Records, naming it after Blanco.
 In a television biographical film Cocaine Godmother, which premiered in 2018 on the Lifetime channel, Blanco is portrayed by Catherine Zeta-Jones.
 In 2018, she was mentioned in the chorus of NBA Young Boy's song "Slime Belief".
 In the 2018 song "Portland" by Drake featuring Quavo and Travis Scott, she is mentioned in the second verse.
 She is mentioned in the 2019 remix of song “Suge (Yea Yea)” by DaBaby featuring Nicki Minaj.
 As of 2020, there were plans to produce a film titled The Godmother, starring Jennifer Lopez as Blanco.
 Blanco is to be portrayed by the Colombian-American actress Sofia Vergara in a Netflix limited series titled Griselda, announced in November 2021.
 "Griselda Blanco", a song by Toronto Drill rappers Pengz and Two Two, was certified Platinum in Canada.

See also
 List of people deported or removed from the United States
 Pablo Escobar
 Enedina Arellano Félix, another well-known female alleged cartel leader

References

Sources
 
 Pablo Escobar and Colombian Narcoculture by Aldona Bialowas Pobutsky

External links
 Griselda Blanco pagina web Link may not work (last checked 2.April, 2017)
 Washington Post: Drugs
 Red Orbit: Cocaine 'Godmother' Released From Prison 
 Female Scarface 
 U.S. v. Griselda Blanco, 861 F.2d 773
 Griselda Blanco – War with Pablo Escobar | Video, Check123 – Video Encyclopedia

1943 births
2012 deaths
20th-century criminals
Bisexual women
Colombian Christians
Cocaine in the United States
Colombian emigrants to the United States
Colombian female murderers
Female organized crime figures
Colombian mass murderers
Colombian crime bosses
Colombian people imprisoned abroad
Deaths by firearm in Colombia
Colombian bisexual people
Medellín Cartel traffickers
Murdered gangsters
People convicted of murder by Florida
People from Cartagena, Colombia
People from Santa Marta
People deported from the United States
People murdered by Colombian organized crime
Colombian drug traffickers
Colombian female criminals
Colombian people convicted of murder
20th-century Colombian LGBT people
21st-century Colombian LGBT people